Rob Burnett (born July 8, 1962) is a producer, director and writer, best known for being the executive producer of Late Show with David Letterman and as the former president of Worldwide Pants.  He is a five-time Emmy award winner, and has received 31 nominations.

Burnett wrote and directed The Fundamentals of Caring starring Paul Rudd, Craig Roberts, and Selena Gomez.  The film was received warmly as the closing night film at the Sundance Film Festival and premiered on Netflix as a Netflix Original on June 24, 2016.

Burnett co-created the critically acclaimed show Ed with Jon Beckerman.  The show earned the two People's Choice Awards and an Emmy nomination for writing.

In 2008, Burnett received the P.T. Barnum Award from Tufts University for his exceptional work in the field of media and entertainment.

Biography 
Burnett grew up in North Caldwell, New Jersey, where he attended West Essex High School. In 1989, Burnett married Eunice Johnson. They have three children: Sydney, Lucy, and Charlie.

Burnett started his television career as an intern for David Letterman in 1985, and later became the head writer for the show in 1992. While acting as head writer, he also helped develop Everybody Loves Raymond. Burnett and Jon Beckerman also created the television comedies Ed and The Knights of Prosperity. Burnett and Beckerman's independent movie We Made This Movie opened in September 2012.

Filmography
 1985 - 1993 “Late Night with David Letterman” 
 1993- 2015 “Late Show with David Letterman”
 2000-2004 “Ed”
 2007 “Knights of Prosperity” 
 2012 - We Made This Movie (Director, writer)
 2016 - The Fundamentals of Caring (Director, writer)

References

External links 
 Burnett's CBS profile
 
 We Made This Movie page

1962 births
Living people
American television writers
People from North Caldwell, New Jersey
American film producers
American male screenwriters
Late Show with David Letterman
American male television writers
Film directors from New Jersey
West Essex High School alumni
Television producers from New Jersey